The University of Georgia College of Engineering is a college within the University of Georgia (UGA) in Athens, Georgia.

The College 

The College of Engineering is one of 17 constituent schools and colleges at the University of Georgia. The college's student body included 2,194 undergraduates and 181 graduate students at the beginning of the fall 2021 semester. The college has 74 faculty members.

Undergraduate Degrees Available
BS Agricultural Engineering 
BS Biochemical Engineering 
BS Biological Engineering 
BS Civil Engineering 
BS Computer Systems Engineering 
BS Electrical and Electronics Engineering 
BS Environmental Engineering 
BS Mechanical Engineering

Graduate Degrees Available
Masters in Biochemical Engineering 
Masters in Biological Engineering 
Masters in Biomanufacturing and Bioprocessing 
Masters in Engineering 
Masters in Agricultural Engineering 
Masters in Civil and Environmental Engineering  

Ph.D. in Engineering

References

External links
 

Engineering
Engineering schools and colleges in the United States
Engineering_universities_and_colleges_in_Georgia_(U.S._state)
Educational institutions established in 2012
2012 establishments in Georgia (U.S. state)
University subdivisions in Georgia (U.S. state)